Asmik Grigorian (born 12 May 1981 in Vilnius) is a Lithuanian operatic soprano.

Life and career
In 1999, Asmik Grigorian graduated from National M. K. Čiurlionis School of Art in Vilnius.
She studied music at the Lithuanian Academy of Music and Theatre and graduated from it with a master's degree in 2006. Grigorian made her operatic debut in Christiansand (Norway) in 2004 as Donna Anna directed by Jonathan Miller, in 2005 she made her Lithuanian debut as Violetta also directed by Jonathan Miller, and in 2006 she became one of the founding members of Vilnius City Opera, singing in La bohème (Mimi and Musetta), Pagliacci (Nedda), Il trovatore, Manon Lescaut, Pique Dame, Eugene Onegin, Sweeney Todd, and Werther. Grigorian later performed at the Latvian National Opera (in 2005 under the direction of Andres Jaegers) and the Mariinsky Theater, performing Il Trittico, Otello, Madama Butterfly, The Gambler, and Rusalka. She is also the recipient of the highest Lithuanian theatre award, the Golden Stage Cross [lt], in 2005 and 2010. 

Since 2011, Grigorian performed in various opera houses on the international stage. She was first noted in operas by Pyotr Ilyich Tchaikovsky, performing leading roles, such as Nastasya in The Enchantress at the Theater an der Wien in September 2014 and as Tatiana in Eugene Onegin at the Komische Oper Berlin in 2016. 

In May 2016, Grigorian was honoured at the International Opera Awards in London as the Best Newcomer ("Young Female Singer"). In December 2016 she performed at the Royal Swedish Opera in the premiere of the opera Fedora by Umberto Giordano in the title role. In her debut at the Salzburg Festival in August 2017, she sang the role of Marie in Alban Berg's opera Wozzeck to critical acclaim. Grigorian was praised as a "superb musician, with deep understanding of Bergian vocal style".

Grigorian made her Edinburgh International Festival debut in August 2019 when Komische Oper Berlin brought their production of Tchaikovsky's Eugene Onegin to Edinburgh.

During her 2019/20 season, Asmik performed the title role in Manon Lescaut at Oper Frankfurt, she also returned to her hometown of Vilnius where she performed the role of Polina in The Gambler. This role was reprised towards the end of her season at the Mariinsky Theatre in Saint Petersburg. Performances of Norma, Elektra, and Jenůfa were canceled due to Covid-19.

Asmik began her 2020/21 season as Cio-Cio-San (Madama Butterfly) at the Wiener Staatsoper and then at the Mariinsky Theatre, then later in the season at the Deutsche Oper. She also sang the role of Liza in Tchaikovsky's Pique Dame at the Mariinsky Theatre, Rusalka at the Teatro Real de Madrid under the baton of Maestro Ivor Bolton and the title role in Salome at the Bolshoi Theatre conducted by Tugan Sokhiev. Her season ended with performances of Der Fliegende Holländer at the Bayreuther Festspiele and Elektra at the Salzburger Festspiele conducted by Franz Welser-Möst.

Grigorian's 2021/22 season began with a house and role debut at the Royal Opera House in a new production of Jenůfa conducted by Henrik Nánási. She then returned to the role of Salome at the Bolshoi Theatre in Moscow and Cio-Cio San at the Royal Swedish Opera. In concert, she performed as part of the Aids-Stiftung Gala at the Staatsoper Berlin, and as Marie in Drei Bruchstücke aus Wozzeck at the Teatro del Maggio and the Elbphilharmonie. At the Wiener Staatsoper, Asmik performs the title role in Manon Lescaut. At the Staatsoper Berlin, she performed the title role in Jenůfa in May and June, went on a European tour with pianist Lukas Geniusas in support of their recently released album, Dissonance. To end her season, Asmik returned to the Salzburger Festspiele to perform all three leading roles in a new production of Puccini's Il Trittico, directed by Christof Loy.

Asmik commenced the 2022/23 season with a continuation of her album recital tour with pianist Lukas Geniusas. She returned to two of her signature title-roles this season, firstly, in Rusalka at the Dvořák Prague festival and then at the Royal Opera House and secondly, in Jenůfa at the Wiener Staatsoper. Grigorian later appeared in the title-role of Tchaikovsky's The Enchantress and Puccini’s Manon Lescaut at Oper Frankfurt. She also made her Japanese debut as the title-role in Salome with the Tokyo Symphony Orchestra.  

Grigorian is the official ambassador for the Rimantas Kaukenas Charity.

Family 
Asmik Grigorian is the daughter of the Armenian tenor Gegham Grigoryan (1951–2016) and the Lithuanian soprano  (b. 1947), LMTA professor.

She has two children, one son and one daughter.

Grigorian also has three brothers, Tigran, Irvidas Čeesaitis and Vartan Grigorian, who is a conductor.

Current opera roles

Previous roles

Concert repertoire 
 Requiem Op. 96 – Mieczysław Weinberg (World Premier) 
 Requiem - Andrew Lloyd Webber
 Requiem in D minor, K. 626 - Wolfgang Amadeus Mozart
 Stabat mater – Giovanni Battista Pergolesi
 Messa da Requiem - Giuseppe Verdi
 Symphony No. 8 – Gustav Mahler 
 War Requiem, Op. 66 – Benjamin Britten 
 Requiem in B♭ minor, Op. 89 – Antonín Dvořák 
 Stabat Mater, Op. 58 (B. 71) – Antonín Dvořák 
 Symphony No. 14 in G minor, Op. 135 – Dmitri Shostakovich

Awards 
 Ópera XXI: Female Opera Singer of the Year (2022) 
 Best female singer in International Opera Awards (2019)
 Order for Merits to Lithuania, Knight's Cross (2018)
 Best emerging artist in International Opera Awards (2016)
Austrian Theater Awards – Best Leading Role (2019)
Opernwelt Critics Choice – Singer of the Year (2019)
Franco Abbiati award (2020)
Olivier Award (Jenůfa) for best production (2022)
Order for Merits to Lithuania, Knight's Cross (2018)
Stage Cross in 2005 for Best Debut as Violetta 
Stage Cross in 2009 for Best Singer for Mrs. Lovett
Lithuanian National Prize for Culture and Arts (2019)
Armenian Movses Khorenatsi Medal, 2021

Discography 
 With Dmitri Hvorostovsky: Dmitri Hvorostovsky Sings of War, Peace, Love and Sorrow, as duet partner in War and Peace by Sergey Prokofiev and The Demon by Anton Rubinstein. Delos International, 2016
 Dissonance, Asmik Grigorian & Lukas Geniusas, Alpha Classics, 25 March 2022

DVDs 
 2019: Strauss – Salome (Julian Pregardien, Asmik Grigorian, John Daszak, Romeo Castellucci, Anna Maria Chiuri, Gabor Bretz)
 2021: Strauss – Elektra (Ausrine Stundyte, Tanja Ariane Baumgartner, Asmik Grigorian, Michael Laurenz, Franz Welser-Möst)
 2021: Dvořák – Rusalka (Asmik Grigorian, Eric Cutler, Karita Mattila, Katarina Dalayman, Ivor Bolton)
 2022: Wagner – Der fliegende Holländer (Georg Zeppenfeld, Asmik Grigorian, Eric Cutler, John Lundgren, Oksana Lyniv, Dmitri Tcherniakov)

See also 

Lithuanian opera

References

External links 

1981 births
Knight's Crosses of the Order for Merits to Lithuania
Musicians from Vilnius
Lithuanian operatic sopranos
21st-century women opera singers
Lithuanian people of Armenian descent
Living people
20th-century Lithuanian women singers